Yo amo a Paquita Gallego (international title: I love Paquita Gallego) is a Spanish-language television drama series from Colombia which aired in 1998 and 1999. Unlike standard soap operas where a poor girl falls for a rich boy, this drama has supernatural and thriller theme. Paquita Gallego, the main character, is a product of a gang rape. She is born on a stormy night, and she can't cry because she doesn't have tears. To reach her happy ending with Andres Hidalgo, she has to pass five obstacles with the support of her grandaunt's spirit.

Plot
Soledad Gallego, a poor girl is in love with Javier Hidalgo, the son of the richest man in town. One night she is gang raped by three men including a club owner and a butcher. She gets pregnant but can't tell which one of the rapists is the father. Carolina Hidalgo, Javier's mother, uses the incident to separate Javier and Soledad, by telling him that Soledad has betrayed him.

Soledad's daughter, Paquita, is born on a stormy night. She never cries, because she doesn't have tears. Little Paquita goes to her mother's rapists asking them which one of them is her father, but none of them can tell. The three rapists die that night in a car accident, leaving the mystery forever unsolved.

Javier married to Margarita, a girl from high society and has a son, Andres. Andres and Paquita have been really good childhood friends and they go to the same school. Paquita is bullied by Rina Marcela because she's poor, fatherless, and has skin rash all over her face and body. But mostly, it's because Rina Marcela has feeling for Andres. After realizing the situation, Chavela Vargas, Soledad's aunt and a tarot reader, home-schools her.

Paquita is treated by Raimundo Rugeles, a doctor who falls in love with her mother. As she grows up, her skin rash is cured and she looks beautiful. She and Andres meet again and they fall in love. Andres has always loved Paquita, he has been painting hearts on the walls with "Yo Amo a Paquita Gallego" (I Love Paquita Gallego) written in them. Javier, seeing this as a redemption for Soledad, approves their relationship, even though his family wish to see Andres marries Rina Marcela instead. When Hidalgo family goes abroad, their plane crashes and it is reported that no one survives. Soledad dies of a broken heart and Chavela dies from alcohol soon after, leaving Paquita all alone. One thing leads to another, she has no other choice but to marry Raimundo. Paquita doesn't know that Andres is still alive. When he returns, Paquita is already married. Devastated, Andres sleeps with Rina Marcella and is forced to marry her out of guilt.

Chavela is back from the death as Paquita's subconscious and she narrates the whole Paquita's story. In the death realm, there are five candles that represent the obstacles that Paquita must face to get her happy ending.

The first candle represents Raimundo. Even though he is rich, he is extremely religious and forces Paquita to live a simple but dull life. Raimundo dies from heart attack after Paquita bitterly goes to him to consummate their marriage. He leaves Paquita a great inheritance. Paquita sells her properties and moves to the city.

The second candle represents Alejandro Olmos, an underwear model that seduces Paquita to marry him just so he can manipulate her money. Their marriage lives short, Alejandro dies in a skydiving accident.

The third candle represents Tatiana Martin, a horror novelist. She offers to make a story based on Paquita's life, but ends up being a psychopath. She dies from drugs overdose.

Meanwhile, Andres and Rina Marcela's marriage falls apart. Andres is still in love in Paquita and has been with her throughout her three obstacles. Rina Marcela finally gives up after she realizes that she's sterile. Paquita and Andres get marry and has a daughter, Little Paquita.

The fourth and the fifth candles are Rina Marcela and Anibal, a rich landlord who falls in love with Paquita. An incident causes Paquita to lose her memories and Rina Marcela and her father Ramon take the opportunity to send Paquita to a mental home. Anibal, a murderer and psychopath, kidnaps Paquita and hides her at his ranch. Rina Marcela tries to take Paquita's place and win Andres' and Little Paquita's heart. After a long and horrific search, Andres finally finds out Paquita's whereabouts. In the climax, desperate Rina Marcela shoots Anibal. A fight ensues resulting the barn explodes, killing the two and presumably Paquita.

Grieving but still believing that Paquita is still alive, Andres paints the whole city with hearts and writes "Yo Amo a Paquita Gallego" (I Love Paquita Gallego) inside them, just as he used to do when he was a boy. Paquita, who successfully escaped before the explosion happened, starts collecting pieces of her memory. When she sees Andres' writings and hears her daughter calling her, for the first time ever since she was born, she finally sheds the tears and cries.

The whole candles are out, Chavela goes back to heaven, Andres and Paquita remarried at the church and everything ends well.

Cast

1998 telenovelas
Colombian telenovelas
RTI Producciones telenovelas